This article contains records and statistics for the Japanese professional football club, Urawa Red Diamonds.

J.League

Domestic cup competitions

Major international competitions

Top scorers by season

International Games

Key:
aet - after extra time
PS - after penalty shootout

References

Urawa Red Diamonds
Urawa Red Diamonds